William Creighton Jr. (October 29, 1778 – October 1, 1851) was the 1st Secretary of State of Ohio, a United States representative from Ohio and a United States district judge of the United States District Court for the District of Ohio.

Education and career

Born on October 29, 1778, in Berkeley County, Virginia (now West Virginia), Creighton graduated from Dickinson College in 1795 and read law in 1798. He was admitted to the bar and entered private practice in Chillicothe, Ross County, Northwest Territory (State of Ohio from March 1, 1803) from 1798 to 1803. He was the 1st Secretary of State of Ohio from 1803 to 1808. He resumed private practice in Chillicothe from 1808 to 1809. He was the United States Attorney for the District of Ohio from 1809 to 1811. He was a member of the Ohio House of Representatives in 1810. He again resumed private practice in Chillicothe from 1811 to 1812.

Congressional service

Creighton was elected as a Democratic-Republican from Ohio's 3rd congressional district to the United States House of Representatives of the 13th United States Congress to fill the vacancy caused by the resignation of United States Representative Duncan McArthur. He was reelected to the 14th United States Congress and served from May 4, 1813, to March 3, 1817. He was an unsuccessful candidate for election in 1815 to the United States Senate from Ohio. He was elected as an Adams Republican from Ohio's 6th congressional district to the United States House of Representatives of the 20th United States Congress and served from March 4, 1827, until his resignation in 1828 to accept a federal judicial position. He was reelected as an Anti-Jacksonian to the United States House of Representatives of the 21st and 22nd United States Congresses, serving from March 4, 1829, to March 3, 1833. He was not a candidate for renomination in 1832. Following his first two terms in Congress, Creighton was President of the Chillicothe Branch of the Second Bank of the United States in 1817. In between his terms in Congress, Creighton engaged in private practice in Chillicothe from 1817 to 1827.

Federal judicial service

Creighton received a recess appointment from President John Quincy Adams on November 1, 1828, to a seat on the United States District Court for the District of Ohio vacated by Judge Charles Willing Byrd. He was nominated to the same position by President Adams on December 11, 1828. His service terminated on March 3, 1829, after his nomination was not confirmed by the United States Senate, which never voted on his nomination. The Senate on February 16, 1829, passed a resolution that it was “not expedient to fill the vacancy at the present session of Congress.”

Later career and death

Following the termination of his federal judicial service, Creighton resumed private practice in Chillicothe from 1833 to 1851. He died on October 8, 1851, in Chillicothe. He was interred in Grand View Cemetery in Chillicothe.

Family

Creighton had married Elizabeth Meade in September 1805, and they had six daughters and three sons.

References

Sources

Further reading
 A compilation of laws, treaties, resolutions, and ordinances of the general and state governments which relate to lands in the state of Ohio.  Columbus: Printed by G. Nashee, state printer, 1825, 534 pgs.
 History of lower Scioto Valley, Ohio.   Chicago: Interstate Publishing Co., 1884, 911 pgs.
 Taylor, William Alexander.  Ohio statesmen and annals of progress: from the year 1788 to the year 1900.  Columbus, Ohio: Press of the Westbote Co., state printers, 1899 (©1898), 458 pgs.
 Gilkey, Elliot Howard   The Ohio hundred year book: a hand-book of the public men and public institutions of Ohio, from the formation of the Northwest Territory (1787) to July 1, 1901. Columbus: F.J. Heer, state printer, 1901, 779 pgs.
 Bennett, Henry Holcomb, The county of Ross: a history of Ross County, Ohio.  Madison, Wis.: S. A. Brant, 1902, 729 pgs.
 Galbreath, C. B.   Ohio emblems and monuments: seals, flag, flower, buckeye, jewels, McKinley Memorial Columbus, Ohio: Board of Library Commissioners, 1907?, 28 pgs.
 Utter, William T.  The frontier state from 1803 to 1825.  Columbus, Ohio: Ohio State Archaeological and Historical Society, 1942, 468 pgs.
 A Standard history of Ross County, Ohio.  Chicago: Lewis Pub. Co. 1917, 1006 pgs.
 Johnson, Ross B., West Virginia Estate Settlements, Berkeley County from 1722 to 1815, West Virginia History Vol XVII-XXIV, 1955

External links
 
 
 

1778 births
1851 deaths
Judges of the United States District Court for the District of Ohio
United States federal judges appointed by John Quincy Adams
19th-century American judges
Members of the Ohio House of Representatives
Politicians from Chillicothe, Ohio
Ohio Whigs
19th-century American politicians
Ohio University trustees
Secretaries of State of Ohio
Unsuccessful recess appointments to United States federal courts
Dickinson College alumni
Ohio sheriffs
Burials at Grandview Cemetery (Chillicothe, Ohio)
United States Attorneys for the District of Ohio
Democratic-Republican Party members of the United States House of Representatives from Ohio
National Republican Party members of the United States House of Representatives
Ohio National Republicans
United States federal judges admitted to the practice of law by reading law